Screen Rant is an entertainment website that offers news in the fields of television, films, video games, and film theories. Screen Rant was launched by Vic Holtreman in 2003, and originally had its primary office in Ogden, Utah. Screen Rant has expanded its coverage with red-carpet events in Los Angeles, New York film festivals and San Diego Comic-Con panels. The associated YouTube channel was created on August 18, 2008, and has over 8.36 million subscribers and over 4,000 videos.

In February 2015, Screen Rant was acquired by Valnet Inc., an online media company based in Montreal, Quebec.

Pitch Meeting
The channel previously hosted a video series called Pitch Meeting by Ryan George, who produced over 200 videos by September 2020, which had garnered 250 million views.

References

External links

American entertainment news websites
Infotainment
Internet properties established in 2003
YouTube channels
YouTube channels launched in 2010
YouTube critics and reviewers